The Centriscidae are a family of fishes from the order Syngnathiformes which includes the snipefishes, shrimpfishes, and bellowfishes. A small family, consisting of only about a dozen marine species, they are of an unusual appearance, as reflected by their common names. The species in this family are restricted to relatively shallow, tropical parts of the Indo-Pacific.

Description
They have extremely compressed, razor-like bodies which have a sharp ventral edge and a dorsal surface which is nearly straight in profile ending in a long snout which has a tiny mouth with pincer-like jaws which lack teeth. The spiny part of the dorsal fin is located close to the tail and is made of one long, sharp spine at the anterior end with two shorter spines behind that. The soft, posterior part of the dorsal fin and the caudal fin are situated on the ventral surface and lie below the posterior-most part of the body, which is pointed. The pelvic fins are small and are located around the middle of its body while the pectoral fins are  larger. The body is almost completely covered in thin, translucent bony plates which are created by expansion of its vertebrae. The species within this family do not have a lateral line. These fish tend to swim with their heads pointed towards the substrate, although why they do this is unclear. Some species occur within beds of sea grass while other species are reef fishes. They are predators of zooplankton.

Taxonomy
In some classifications, the subfamily Macroramphosinae is raised to the level of family, Macroramphosidae. The placement of the genus Centriscops is unclear: ITIS places it in Macroramphosidae, as does the 5th edition of Nelson (2016).

The two genera currently classified within the Centriscidae are:

Aeoliscus  Jordan & Starks, 1902
Centriscus Linnaeus, 1758

References 

 
Marine fish families
Taxa named by Charles Lucien Bonaparte